Marc Lubick (born November 13, 1977) is an American football coach who is the assistant wide receivers coach for the Buffalo Bills of the National Football League (NFL).

College playing career
Lubick played collegiately as a defensive back at Montana State University from 1997 to 1999.

Coaching career
Lubick launched his coaching career in 2000 as a defensive student assistant at Colorado State University. After the 2002 campaign, Lubick joined the St. Louis Rams for two years as a scout. Lubick would follower this by serving four years with the Houston Texans, including two seasons as an assistant wide receivers coach. He would become the wide receivers coach at Vanderbilt in 2014 following those 4 years only to return to the NFL the next year with the Denver Broncos as an assistant wide receivers coach. On February 7, 2016, Lubick was part of the Broncos coaching staff that won Super Bowl 50. In the game, the Broncos defeated the Carolina Panthers by a score of 24–10. After this Super Bowl win he went to the Bills in a number of different offensive roles and is still currently there.

Personal life
Marc is the son of former Colorado State Rams football coach Sonny Lubick and brother of University of Nebraska offensive coordinator/wide receivers coach Matt Lubick.

Marc is married and lives with his wife Stephanie.

References

Colorado State University alumni
Houston Texans coaches
Sportspeople from Bozeman, Montana
Montana State Bobcats football players
Colorado State Rams football coaches
St. Louis Rams coaches
Vanderbilt Commodores football coaches
Denver Broncos coaches
Buffalo Bills coaches
1977 births
Living people
Coaches of American football from Montana
Players of American football from Montana